Janke Nunatak is an isolated nunatak,  northeast of Carlson Peak in the western Hauberg Mountains, in Palmer Land, Antarctica. It was mapped by the United States Geological Survey from surveys and U.S. Navy air photos, 1961–67, and was named by the Advisory Committee on Antarctic Names for John W. Janke, a radioman with the Eights Station winter party in 1964.

References

Nunataks of Palmer Land